Giachem Guidon (born 4 September 1961 in Bever) is a Swiss cross-country skier who competed from 1982 to 1994. Competing in four Winter Olympics, he earned his best career finish of fourth in the 4 × 10 km relay at Calgary in 1988 and his best individual finish of 12th in the 15 km event at Sarajevo in 1984.

Guidon's best individual finish at the FIS Nordic World Ski Championships was eighth twice (30 km: 1985, 15 km: 1989). His best World Cup finish was second in a 30 km event in Sweden in 1985.

Cross-country skiing results
All results are sourced from the International Ski Federation (FIS).

Olympic Games

World Championships

World Cup

Season standings

Individual podiums
 2 podiums

Team podiums
 1 podium

References

External links

1961 births
Cross-country skiers at the 1984 Winter Olympics
Cross-country skiers at the 1988 Winter Olympics
Cross-country skiers at the 1992 Winter Olympics
Cross-country skiers at the 1994 Winter Olympics
Living people
Swiss male cross-country skiers
Olympic cross-country skiers of Switzerland
20th-century Swiss people